The Trevor Project is an American nonprofit organization founded in 1998. Focused on suicide prevention efforts among lesbian, gay, bisexual, transgender, queer, and questioning (LGBTQ) youth, they offer a toll-free telephone number where confidential assistance is provided by trained counselors. The stated goals of the project are to provide crisis intervention and suicide prevention services for youth (defined by the organization as people under 25), as well as to offer guidance and resources to parents and educators in order to foster safe, accepting, and inclusive environments for all youth, at home, schools and colleges.

History

The project was founded in 1998 in West Hollywood, California, by Celeste Lecesne, Peggy Rajski, and Randy Stone. They are the creators of the 1994 Academy Award–winning short film Trevor, a dramedy about Trevor, a gay thirteen-year-old boy who, when rejected by friends because of his sexuality, makes an attempt to commit suicide. When the film was scheduled to air on HBO television in 1998, the filmmakers realized that some of the program's young viewers might be facing the same kind of crisis as Trevor and began to search for a support line to be broadcast during the airing. They discovered that no such helpline existed and decided to dedicate themselves to forming the resource: an organization to promote acceptance of LGBTQ youth, and to aid in crisis and suicide prevention among that group.

The Trevor Lifeline was established with seed funds provided by The Colin Higgins Foundation and HBO's license fee. As a result, it became the first nationwide, around-the-clock crisis and suicide prevention helpline for LGBTQ youth. The project also provides online support to young people through the project's website, as well as guidance and resources to educators and parents.

In November 2009, the project was contracted by the Tulare County Suicide Prevention Task Force, located in Tulare County, California. With this agreement, the project received public funds for the first time. In June 2009, seven Tulare County volunteers completed The Trevor Project Lifeguard Workshop Facilitator training. “Lifeguard workshops” have been done in schools in Tulare County municipalities, including Dinuba, Lindsay, Porterville and Visalia, as well as in Hanford in adjacent Kings County.

The Trevor Project has been supported by various celebrities, including Melanie Martinez, Ellen DeGeneres, Troye Sivan, Kathy Griffin, Shay Mitchell, Daniel Radcliffe, Neil Patrick Harris, James Marsden, Chris Colfer, Kim Kardashian, Darren Criss, Dianna Agron, George Takei, Anderson Cooper, John Oliver  and Tyler Oakley. In 2021, the first openly gay active NFL player, Carl Nassib, used his coming out to also announce a $100,000 donation to The Trevor Project.

Research 
The Trevor Project also undertakes mental health research focusing on LGBTQ youth. According to the project's strategic plan, "The Trevor Project will expand the scale of its flagship national survey while continuing to grow visibility and general public consumption of its research; and to incorporate new studies, scientific advances, and research protocols to build on its thought leadership and the impact of its programs." As of 2022, research found that 14% of LGBTQ youth reported a past-year suicide attempt, with LGBTQ youth of color and transgender and nonbinary reporting higher rates illustrating the importance of examining findings intersectionally."

Projects

The Trevor Lifeline

The Trevor Lifeline is a nationwide, around-the-clock crisis and suicide prevention helpline for LGBTQ youth in the United States. The lifeline is a free and confidential service from counselors trained to listen without judgement and can refer callers to supportive local organizations and groups. The number for the line in the United States is 1-866-488-7386.

TrevorText
TrevorText is a confidential text messaging service provided by The Trevor Project, available 24 hours a day, 7 days a week.

TrevorChat
TrevorChat is a free, confidential, live and secure online messaging service provided by The Trevor Project, available 24 hours a day, 7 days a week.

TrevorSpace
TrevorSpace is an online social networking community for LGBTQ+ youth ages 13 through 24, along with their friends and allies. Youth can create personal profiles, which are verified by the administrators before they are allowed to interact with other profiles, and connect with other young people internationally, as well as find resources within their communities. TrevorSpace is commonly used to receive or give advice and make friends who have shared similar experiences as the user. TrevorSpace is carefully monitored by administrators designated by the project to ensure all content is age-appropriate, youth-friendly and factual. Members over the age of 18 cannot privately message members under the age of 18. TrevorSpace links members to The Trevor Project's home page, where information about The Trevor Lifeline, "Dear Trevor," and other resources are available. The software used to create TrevorSpace was donated to the project by Tim Gill, an American software entrepreneur and philanthropist.

Palette Fund Internship Program
Through the Palette Fund Internship Program, the project provides for five internships in both its Los Angeles and New York City offices. Interns are placed among the program, communication, and development departments. The program provides an opportunity for young people to learn about working in the non-profit sector.  Palette Fund internships are specifically designed to introduce young leaders to the LGBTQ movement.

Youth Advisory Council
The Youth Advisory Council serves as a liaison between youth nationwide and the project on issues surrounding suicide, sexuality and gender identity. The council submits recommendations to the project in an effort to increase project visibility and best serve the LGBTQ youth population.

School workshops
The project's Lifeguard Workshop Program uses a structured, age-appropriate curriculum to address topics around sexuality, gender identity, the impacts of language and behavior, and what it means for young people to feel different. The program also teaches young people to recognize depression and suicide amongst their peers, the impacts of language and behavior on LGBTQ youth, and suicide prevention skills in schools.

Fundraisers and annual awards ceremonies

Tyler Oakley's fundraiser
On February 10, 2014, YouTube personality Tyler Oakley started a fundraiser to collect $150,000 for the Trevor Project. Oakley set the deadline for the money to be collected by the time of his birthday, March 22, but the goal was reached earlier than expected. Oakley later extended the fundraiser and more than $462,000 had been raised on March 29. On March 31, the fundraiser ended, with a total of $525,754 raised.

Annual Award Ceremony Fundraisers 
The Trevor Project uses annual events to honor individuals and businesses that have been leaders in supporting LGBT rights and advocated against bullying and hate crimes. In 1998, it held the first Cracked Xmas fundraiser in Los Angeles, changing its name to TrevorLIVE Los Angeles in 2010. In 2001, a New York City-based annual event was added, using entertainers to raise financial resources for the organization. This NYC-based event has had three names, beginning as "A Very Funny Whatever", changing to TrevorNY in 2007 and then to TrevorLIVE New York in 2011. In the 2018 financial year (August 2017–July 2018), these events raised over $3,030,000.

The New York City event is typically held in June each year, and the Los Angeles event is typically held in late November or early December each year.

A variety of awards have been given over time and not all awards are given each year.

List of Ceremonies

Awards

Trevor Hero Award 
This award honors an individual who, through their example, support, volunteerism or occupation, is an inspiration to LGBTQ youth. 
2005: Tony Kushner
2006: Michael Cunningham
2007: Nathan Lane
2008: Alan Cumming
2009: Dustin Lance Black
2010: Vanessa Williams
2011: Daniel Radcliffe and Lady Gaga
2012: Susan Sarandon and Katy Perry
2013: Cindy McCain and Jane Lynch
2014: Arianna Huffington and Robert Greenblatt
2015: Ian McKellen and Michael Lombardi
2016: Jordan Roth, Ritchie Jackson and Kelly Osbourne
2017: Dan Reynolds and Tom Ford
2018: Lena Waithe, Greg Berlanti, Ryan Murphy and the cast of Pose
2019: Cara Delevingne

Trevor Youth Innovator Award 
Awarded to people under the age of 25 who work to support, inspire, and empower LGBTQ youth. 
2013: Cason Crane and Adam White
2014: Tyler Oakley and Skylar Kergil
2015: Ryan Fecteau and Jazz Jennings
2016: Cole Ray Davis and Ingrid Nilsen
2018: Amandla Stenberg
2019: Hayley Kiyoko

Trevor Commitment Award & Trevor 20/20 Visionary Award 
Awarded to businesses that support LGBT rights, started in 2007.
2007: Bravo
2008: TeenNick
2009: CNN
2010: Macy's
2011: Google
2012: MTV and Audi of America
2013: Wells Fargo and Toyota
2014: Goldman Sachs and Yahoo!
2015: Johnson & Johnson and The Walt Disney Corporation
2016: Twitter and Facebook
2017: Deloitte
2018: McKinsey & Company and AT&T Mobility and Communications
2019: Ernst & Young and PricewaterhouseCoopers

Trevor Life Award 
The Trevor Life Award honors a person who is an inspiration to LGBTQ youth. 
2002: Armistead Maupin
2003: Rosie O'Donnell
2004: Debra Messing and Megan Mullally
2005: Marc Cherry
2006: Roseanne Barr
2007: Ellen DeGeneres
2008: Sigourney Weaver
2009: Neil Patrick Harris
2010: Kathy Griffin

Trevor Hope Award 
The Trevor Hope Award is presented to businesses that have demonstrated support for the LGBTQ community and "has increased the visibility and understanding of LGBT issues." It was first presented in 2004.
2004: Wells Fargo
2005: LPI Media
2006: HBO
2007: Clear Channel Communications
2008: Lifetime
2009: AT&T
2010: Levi Strauss & Co.

Icon/Champions Award 
The Trevor Champions Award is presented to individuals in recognition of their "continued allyship and commitment to supporting The Trevor Project's mission to end suicide among LGBTQ (Lesbian, Gay, Bisexual, Transgender, Queer, and Questioning) young people".
2017: Edith Windsor and Kristin Chenoweth
2019: Kelly Ripa, Mark Consuelos and Cybill Shepherd

See also

 Athlete Ally
 List of LGBT-related organizations

References

External links
 

Anti-bullying campaigns
Anti-bullying organizations in the United States
Companies based in Los Angeles County, California
Crisis hotlines
LGBT charities
LGBT health organizations in the United States
LGBT youth organizations based in the United States
Organizations established in 1998
Suicide prevention
West Hollywood, California
Suicide in the United States
Articles containing video clips
LGBT and suicide
Medical and health organizations based in California
Charities based in California
Shorty Award winners